Changying is a station on Line 6 of the Beijing Subway. This station opened on December 30, 2012.

Station layout 
The station has underground dual-island platforms.

Exits 
There are 4 exits, lettered B, C, E, and F. Exits B, E and F are accessible.

Gallery

References

External links
 

Railway stations in China opened in 2012
Beijing Subway stations in Chaoyang District